Rosedale Heights School of the Arts (RHSA) is an arts-based high school in Toronto, Ontario, Canada.

History
Formerly Castle Frank, the school has been reinvented and re-purposed by Principal Barrie Sketchley. It is a non-semester school with an emphasis on the arts. Students can take dance, dramatic arts, music-instrumental (band or strings), vocals, visual and media arts. In 2005, Maclean's Magazine named RHSA one of the best arts-focus high schools in Canada, as well as one of the three best special-focus schools in Canada.

In 2017, 8.4 percent of Rosedale Heights School of the Arts students had not been vaccinated due to philosophical or religious reasons, the highest percentage of any Toronto high school.

Overview
RHSA accepts students from all over the Greater Toronto Area. It is the only arts school in the Toronto District School Board that does not use auditions for acceptance. It is also the only arts school that encourages students to explore interdisciplinary arts by not expecting students to choose a "major" in one art and making students select a variety of arts courses in their first two years at the school.

Notable alumni

Petra Collins - photographer
Leandra Earl - keyboardist, The Beaches
Eliza Enman-McDaniel - drummer, The Beaches
Jordan Miller - singer and bassist, The Beaches
Kylie Miller - lead guitarist, The Beaches
Kristy Yang - actress

Facilities
RHSA has a 670-seat auditorium, two band/orchestra rehearsal spaces, three fully equipped dance studios, two drama rooms, a dark room, a vocal room, and various visual art studios used for printmaking, graphic design, etc.

Acceptance 
RHSA accepts students from the Greater Toronto Area. This school does not use any auditions for acceptance.

References

See also
List of high schools in Ontario

High schools in Toronto
Educational institutions in Canada with year of establishment missing